Howard Wilbur Krist (February 28, 1916 – April 23, 1989) was a pitcher in Major League Baseball from 1937 to 1946. "Spud" (a nickname that described his humble beginnings on a New York Potato Farm,) played his entire career for the St. Louis Cardinals of the National League, and was a member of the 1942 and 1946 World Series Championship teams.

Krist's 10–0 record in 1941, his first full season, is the third-best undefeated season ever. He served in the Army for two years in Europe during World War II, and lost his effectiveness as a pitcher due to a injury sustained while leaping into a foxhole.

References

External links

1916 births
1989 deaths
Major League Baseball pitchers
St. Louis Cardinals players
Bloomington Bloomers players
Columbus Red Birds players
Rochester Red Wings players
Houston Buffaloes players
Baseball players from New York (state)
People from Henrietta, New York
United States Army personnel of World War II